Dorchester is a neighborhood in the Northwest District of Baltimore. It is located between the neighborhoods of Arlington (north), Central Forest Park (south), Howard Park (west) and Gallway-Garrison (east). Maryland Route 26 (Liberty Heights Avenue) draws boundary between Dorchester and Central Forest Park. Dorchester's other boundaries are marked by Oakford Avenue, Eldorado Avenue and Garrison Boulevard.

MTA Bus Route 52 and Route 97 (Mondawmin Metro Shuttle Bug) provide service along Liberty Heights Avenue, connecting with the Metro Subway at Mondawmin station. Route 91 (MTA Maryland) runs along Garrison Boulevard, providing service between Sinai Hospital (north) and Downtown Baltimore (south).

Two public schools are located in the Dorchester neighborhood: Garrison Middle School, at 3910 Barrington Road, and Forest Park High School, at 3701 Eldorado Avenue.

Demographics
A study by the Baltimore City Health Department in 2008 reported that Dorchester residents were 97% African-American, compared with a city average of 64%. Infant mortality for Dorchester, at 11.4 per thousand, was slightly below the city average of 11.7, but life expectancy of the neighborhood's residents, at 70.2 years, was somewhat shorter than the city average of 70.9 years.

Dorchester age ranges

Household income
Dorchester had a median household income of $31,441 in 2008. However, household incomes producing this median varied widely, with the following ranges reported:

See also
 List of Baltimore neighborhoods

References 

African-American history in Baltimore
Forest Park, Baltimore
Neighborhoods in Baltimore
Northwest Baltimore